Georgia State Route 21 Spur may refer to:

 Georgia State Route 21 Spur (Chatham County): a former spur route of State Route 21 that existed in northern Chatham County
 Georgia State Route 21 Spur (Garden City): a spur route of State Route 21 that exists in Garden City
 Georgia State Route 21 Spur (Springfield): a spur route of State Route 21 that partially exists in Springfield

021 Spur